The men's horizontal bar competition was one of eight events for male competitors in artistic gymnastics at the 1984 Summer Olympics in Los Angeles. The qualification and final rounds took place on July 29, 31 and August 4 at UCLA’s Pauley Pavilion. There were 71 competitors from 19 nations, with nations competing in the team event having 6 gymnasts while other nations could have to up to 3 gymnasts. The event was won by Shinji Morisue of Japan, continuing the nation's dominant streak where it left off before the 1980 boycott. Morisue scored a perfect 20 in the event (requiring all three exercises to receive perfect 10s); he was one of only three gymnasts to achieve a perfect 20 on an apparatus (and the only male gymnast to do so) during the 20-point era (1952–1988). The gold medal was Japan's sixth on the horizontal bar, all within eight Games (including one in which Japan did not compete at all). Koji Gushiken added a bronze medal for Japan. The People's Republic of China debuted strongly, with a silver medal from Tong Fei.

Background

This was the 16th appearance of the event, which is one of the five apparatus events held every time there were apparatus events at the Summer Olympics (no apparatus events were held in 1900, 1908, 1912, or 1920). None of the six finalists from 1980 returned; all six were from boycotting nations. Soviets had won the last two world championships (and shared silver at both, as well); France's Philippe Vatuone had tied for second in 1983, with Shinji Morisue of Japan and Tong Fei of China even in fourth place. The host nation's hopes were in Peter Vidmar, a world championship finalist.

The People's Republic of China and San Marino each made their debut in the men's horizontal bar. The United States made its 14th appearance, breaking a tie with the absent Hungary for most of any nation; the Americans had missed only the inaugural 1896 event and the boycotted 1980 Games.

Competition format

Each nation entered a team of six gymnasts or up to three individual gymnasts. All entrants in the gymnastics competitions performed both a compulsory exercise and a voluntary exercise for each apparatus. The scores for all 12 exercises were summed to give an individual all-around score. These exercise scores were also used for qualification for the apparatus finals. The two exercises (compulsory and voluntary) for each apparatus were summed to give an apparatus score. 

The 1984 Games expanded the number of finalists from six to eight. Nations were still limited to two finalists each. Others were ranked 9th through 71st. Half of the preliminary score carried over to the final.

Schedule

All times are Pacific Daylight Time (UTC-7)

Results

Seventy-one gymnasts competed in the compulsory and optional rounds on July 29th and 31st. The eight highest scoring gymnasts advanced to the final on August 4th. Each country was limited to two competitors in the final. Half of the points earned by each gymnast during both the compulsory and optional rounds carried over to the final. This constitutes the "prelim" score.

References

Official Olympic Report
www.gymnasticsresults.com
www.gymn-forum.net

Men's horizontal bar
Men's 1984
Men's events at the 1984 Summer Olympics